Vorotan is a village in the Sisian Municipality of the Syunik Province in Armenia. The Vorotnaberd fortress is located near the village.

Demographics 
The Statistical Committee of Armenia reported its population was 282 in 2010, down from 283 at the 2001 census.

Gallery

References 

Populated places in Syunik Province
Populated places in Armenia